Gladys Fairbanks (April 15, 1892 in California – November 2, 1958 in Alameda, California), was an American silent film actress of the 1910s. She was best known for roles in films such as The Poor Little Rich Girl (1917), The Road Between (1917) and Shore Acres (1914).

Filmography
Shore Acres as Ann (1914)
The Poor Little Rich Girl as Jane (1917)
The Road Between as Sarah Abbott (1917)
Who's Your Neighbor? as Mrs Bowers (1917)
The Outsider as Miss Price (1917)
Our Little Wife (1917) (uncredited)

References

3.Changes made in birth and death by great-granddaughter Catherine

External links
 

American silent film actresses
20th-century American actresses
1892 births
1958 deaths